The Presidente Vargas Hydroelectric Plant, is a dam and hydroelectric power plant on the Tibagi River in Telêmaco Borba in Paraná, Brazil.

See also

List of power stations in Brazil

References

External links 
 Consórcio Energético Cruzeiro do Sul 

Dams completed in 1953
Energy infrastructure completed in 1953
Dams in Paraná (state)
Hydroelectric power stations in Paraná (state)
Gravity dams
Telêmaco Borba
Roller-compacted concrete dams